Valery Aleksandrovich Borisov (born 18 September 1966 in Temirtau, Karaganda Region) is a male race walker from Kazakhstan.

Achievements

References

sports-reference

External links
 

1966 births
Living people
People from Temirtau
Kazakhstani male racewalkers
Athletes (track and field) at the 1996 Summer Olympics
Athletes (track and field) at the 2000 Summer Olympics
Athletes (track and field) at the 2004 Summer Olympics
Olympic athletes of Kazakhstan
Asian Games medalists in athletics (track and field)
Athletes (track and field) at the 1998 Asian Games
Athletes (track and field) at the 2002 Asian Games
Asian Games gold medalists for Kazakhstan
Asian Games silver medalists for Kazakhstan
Asian Games bronze medalists for Kazakhstan
Medalists at the 1994 Asian Games
Medalists at the 1998 Asian Games
Medalists at the 2002 Asian Games
Kazakhstani people of Russian descent